John McKinney is the name of:

John McKinney, winner of the 19th Scripps National Spelling Bee in 1946
John McKinney (Florida judge), United States federal judge
John T. McKinney (1785–1837), Indiana Supreme Court judge
John P. McKinney, Connecticut State Senator
John McKinney (Michigan politician), Michigan Secretary of State and Treasurer
John F. McKinney (1827–1903), U.S. Representative from Ohio
John R. McKinney (1921–1997), Medal of Honor in World War II during the campaign to recapture the Philippines from Japanese forces in 1945

See also
Jack McKinney (disambiguation)
John McKenzie (disambiguation)